The Black Hour is a 2014 novel written by Lori Rader-Day and published by Seventh Street Books on 8 July 2014, which later went on to win the Anthony Award for Best First Novel in 2015.

References 

Anthony Award-winning works
American mystery novels
American thriller novels
2014 American novels
Prometheus Books books